The Mill Bridge is a structure that crosses the Kiskiminetas River
between West Leechburg and Leechburg in the U.S. state of Pennsylvania.

A 1938 truss bridge, the structure carries the eponymous Mill Bridge Road between the two boroughs. However, it is not the main access route in the area; rather it was designed for industrial purposes, as it connects central Leechburg with the Allegheny Technologies Ludlum Plant, which has long been a fixture in the area. In 1992, the bridge was rehabilitated.

See also

 List of crossings of the Kiskiminetas River

References

Historic Bridges
Bridge Mapper

Bridges in Armstrong County, Pennsylvania
Bridges completed in 1938
Road bridges in Pennsylvania
Bridges over the Kiskiminetas River
Truss bridges in the United States
Metal bridges in the United States